Clara Castle is a tower house (caiseal) located in County Kilkenny, Ireland.

Location

History

Clara Castle was built in the late 15th/early 16th century by the Shortall family, who lived there until c. 1640. Henry Johnson occupied the castle in the Cromwellian period, and it later passed to the Byrnes; occupants include Anthony Byrne (1656–1720), Lewis Byrne (1690–1766), Mathew Byrne (1694–1754), Anthony Byrne (1725–1810), Michael Byrne (1762–1835).
The castle was occupied up until 1905.

Building
Clara Castle is five storeys tall with a vault above the third floor. The building retains many of its original oak doors and floor beams. There is a murder-hole above the entrance, which is also protected by a yett and drawbar.

The second floor, probably the lord's chamber, has a hooded chimneypiece, mural passage, garderobe and a small bedroom. It was originally painted blue and one wall has a Crucifixion mural. The floor above, contains a secret chamber.

The top floor chamber is the largest and best-lit room in the castle, used for general family living. Its large lintelled fireplace is a secondary insertion, so the fireplace in this room must originally have been in the centre of the floor. The roof above is modern, while the parapets are crenellated in the Irish style with loopholes, alure, machicolation and weeps.

References

National Monuments in County Kilkenny
Castles in County Kilkenny